In mathematics, specifically in order theory and functional analysis, if  is a cone at 0 in a vector space  such that  then a subset  is said to be -saturated if  where  
If  is a collection of subsets of  then 

-saturated sets play an important role in the theory of ordered topological vector spaces and topological vector lattices.

Properties 

If  is an ordered vector space with positive cone  then 

The map  is increasing; that is, if  then  
If  is convex then so is  When  is considered as a vector field over  then if  is balanced then so is 

If  is a filter base (resp. a filter) in  then the same is true of

See also

References

Bibliography

  
  

Functional analysis